Steven Sapp (born and raised in the South Bronx, New York) co-founded The POINT Community Development Corporation (Hunts Point) in 1993 and Universes (poetic theatre ensemble) in 1995, both in collaboration with Mildred Ruiz-Sapp.

Theater credits 
Purgatory
Another I Dies Slowly
Live From the Edge
Slanguage
Blue Suite
Ameriville
Rhythmicity: Flipping The Script
One Shot In Lotus Position
The Ride
The Denver Project
Spring Training
Party People
UniSon

Playwright/Actor - AMERIVILLE (Director Chay Yew); The Denver Project (Curious Theater-Director Dee Covington); One Shot in Lotus Position (The War Anthology-Curious Theater-Director Bonnie Metzger); BLUE SUITE (Director-Chay Yew, previously Eyewitness Blues-NY Theatre Workshop-Director Talvin Wilks); RHYTHMICITY (Humana Festival); SLANGUAGE (NY Theater Workshop-Director Jo Bonney); Director - The Ride (playwright/Actor/Director); The Architecture of Loss (Assistant Director to Chay Yew); Will Powers’ The Seven (Director-The Univ. of Iowa); Alfred Jarry's UBU: Enchained (Director-Teatre Polski, Poland).

Television credits 

 HBO's Bored to Death
 HBO's Def Poetry Jam (Season 4- Episode 9, with UNIVERSES)

Awards/Affiliations 
 2008 Jazz at Lincoln Center Rhythm Road Tour
 2008 TCG - Theatre Communications Group - Peter Zeisler Award
 2002 TCG - Theatre Communications Group - National Directors Award
 2002-2004 and 1999-2001 TCG - Theatre Communications Group, National Theater Artist Residency Program Award
 1999 OBIE Award Grant (The Point CDC & Live From Theater Theater)
 1999 Bessie Awards (The Point CDC)
 1998 and 2002 BRIO Awards (Bronx Recognizes its own-Performance) from the Bronx Council on the Arts
 1998 Union Square Award recipient
 Van Lier Fellowship w/ New Dramatists
 Co-Founder of The Point CDC
 New York Theatre Workshop - Usual Suspect
 Bard College, BA 1989

Publications:
 UNIVERSES - THE BIG BANG (2010 release, TCG Books)
 SLANGUAGE in The Fire This Time (TCG).

References

External links 
 Universes Official site

People from the Bronx
Living people
Year of birth missing (living people)